The 70th edition of the Volta a la Comunitat Valenciana (English: Tour of the Valencian Community) was held from 6 to 10 February 2019. It was run over five stages, of which one was a time trial, covering a total distance of 647 km. It was a 2.1 event on the 2019 UCI Europe Tour. The race was run entirely in the autonomous community of Valencia, starting in Orihuela and finishing in Valencia.

The race was won by Spaniard Ion Izagirre of the  team. Alejandro Valverde and Pello Bilbao, also from Spain, finished second and third.

Teams
Twenty-four teams started the race. Each team had a maximum of seven riders:

Route

Stages

Stage 1

Stage 2

Stage 3

Stage 4

Stage 5

Classifications

References

External links
 

2019
2019 UCI Europe Tour
2019 in Spanish road cycling